The plain-backed sparrow (Passer flaveolus), also called the Pegu sparrow or olive-backed sparrow, is a sparrow found in Southeast Asia. Its range spans from Myanmar to central Vietnam, and south to the western part of Peninsular Malaysia.

The phylogeny of the sparrows has been studied by Arnaiz-Villena et al.  Nuclear mitochondrial DNA pseudogenes were found in these sparrows.

References

Works cited

External links 
Pegu sparrow at the Internet Bird Collection

plain-backed sparrow
Birds of Southeast Asia
plain-backed sparrow
plain-backed sparrow